Sidney Charles Bromley (24 July 1909 – 14 August 1987), credited as Sydney Bromley, was an English character actor. He appeared in more than sixty films and television programmes. On stage, he appeared in the 1924 premiere of Saint Joan, by George Bernard Shaw, as well as the 1957 film of the same name. He appeared in A Midsummer Night's Dream and Twelfth Night during the summer of 1935 at the Open Air Theatre in London. 

Bromley was diagnosed with terminal cancer in July 1986 and died from the illness on 14 August 1987, aged 78.

Partial filmography

 Demobbed (1944) – Announcer (uncredited)
 Brief Encounter (1945) – Johnnie – Second Soldier (uncredited)
 Loyal Heart (1946) – Burton June (uncredited)
 The Mark of Cain (1947) – Martin (Richard's Man) (uncredited)
 To the Public Danger (1948)
 The Dark Road (1948)
 A Date with a Dream (1948) – Stranger in Max's office
 Badger's Green (1949) – Alf – the Ragholt scorer
 Devil's Point (1954) – Enson
 The Love Match (1955) – (uncredited)
 Stolen Time (1955)
 Saint Joan (1957) – Baudricourt's Steward
 Horrors of the Black Museum (1959) – Neighbour
 Captain Clegg (1962) – Old Tom Ketch
 The Piper's Tune (1962) – Shepherd
 Paranoaic (1963) – Tramp (uncredited)
 Father Came Too! (1964) – Lang
 Die, Monster, Die! (1965) – Pierce
 Carry On Cowboy (1965) – Sam Houston
 The Christmas Tree (1966) – Motorist (uncredited)
 Operation Third Form (1966) – Paddy
 Prehistoric Women (1967) – Ullo
 Night of the Big Heat (1967) – Old Tramp
 The Fearless Vampire Killers (1967) – Sleigh Driver
 Smashing Time (1967) – Tramp
 Half a Sixpence (1967) – Pub Character
 Macbeth (1971) – Porter
 No Sex Please, We're British (1973) – Rag & Bone Man
 Frankenstein and the Monster from Hell (1974) – Muller
 Professor Popper's Problem (1974) – Crickle
 Robin Hood Junior (1975) – Alfric
 Jabberwocky (1977) – Dubbing (voice)
 Crossed Swords (1977) – Peasant
 Candleshoe (1977) – Mr. Thresher
 Dangerous Davis (1981) - Mr Harkness
 Dragonslayer (1981) – Hodge
 An American Werewolf in London (1981) – Alf
 The NeverEnding Story (1984) – Engywook
 Pirates (1986) – Diddler
 Anastasia: The Mystery of Anna (1986) – Herbert
 Crystalstone (1987) – Old Man (final film role)

References

External links

1909 births
1987 deaths
English male film actors
English male television actors
Male actors from London
20th-century English male actors